Ali Kandi (also Romanized as ʿAlī Kandī) is a village in Yowla Galdi Rural District, in the Central District of Showt County, West Azerbaijan Province, Iran. At the 2006 census, its population was 39, in 8 families.

References 

Populated places in Showt County